The Pisuerga is a river in northern Spain, the Duero's second largest tributary. It rises in the Cantabrian Mountains in the province of Palencia, autonomous region of Castile and León.
Its traditional source is called Fuente Cobre, but it has been discovered that the real source is a glacier higher in the mountains.  The river flows south into the Douro river shortly after passing through the city of Valladolid. Its length is approximately 270 kilometres (170 mi).

Since the 1950s the water level of the river has been very regular throughout the year due to the huge Aguilar de Campoo dam which collects all the water from the river's rainy upper valleys. This regulation has allowed the creation of vast extensions of irrigated farmland along the Pisuerga's course across the northern Castilian plain.

In Spanish culture
The Spanish phrase "aprovechando que el Pisuerga pasa por Valladolid" ("And now since Pisuerga crosses Valladolid...") is a popular way to point or acknowledge a non sequitur since the river has no bearing with the following "consequence".

See also 
 List of rivers of Spain

References

 
Rivers of Spain
Rivers of Castile and León
Tributaries of the Douro River
Rivers of Burgos
Rivers of Palencia
Rivers of Valladolid